Savićević or Savičević (Cyrillic script: Савићевић) is a Serb and Montenegrin surname. It may refer to:

Božidar Savićević, Serbian actor
Dejan Savićević, Montenegrin football player, former A.C. Milan and Red Star Belgrade player.
Radmila Savićević, Serbian actress
Bojan Savicevic, Austrian American Football Official (Referee) / TV-Expert for NFL on PULS4
Saša Savićević, First Serb in space
Vladimir Savićević, Serbian footballer
Vukan Savićević, Serbian footballer

Serbian surnames